Aung Maung Gyi (born 15 December 1945) is a retired Burmese weightlifter. He won a silver medal at the 1974 Asian Games and set two world record in the snatch, in 1970 and 1972. At the 1972 Summer Olympics he placed fifth.

References

External links
 

1945 births
Living people
Burmese male weightlifters
World Weightlifting Championships medalists
Place of birth missing (living people)
Weightlifters at the 1972 Summer Olympics
World record holders in Olympic weightlifting
Weightlifters at the 1974 Asian Games
Asian Games medalists in weightlifting
Asian Games gold medalists for Myanmar
Asian Games silver medalists for Myanmar
Medalists at the 1974 Asian Games
Olympic weightlifters of Myanmar